Chrysothamnus greenei, called Greene's rabbitbrush , is a North American species of flowering plants in the tribe Astereae within the family Asteraceae. It has been found in eastern California (Mono + Inyo Counties), Nevada, Arizona, New Mexico, Utah, Colorado, and southern Wyoming (Sweetwater County).

Chrysothamnus greenei is a branching shrub up to 50 cm (20 inches) tall with gray bark. It has many small, yellow flower heads clumped into dense arrays. The species grows in sandy locations in desert regions.

References

Astereae
Flora of the Northwestern United States
Flora of the Southwestern United States
Flora of the California desert regions
Flora of the Great Basin
Flora of New Mexico
Plants described in 1876
Taxa named by Asa Gray
Taxa named by Edward Lee Greene
Flora without expected TNC conservation status